Mieres del Camino is a Parish and a town in Mieres, a municipality within the province and autonomous community of Asturias, in northern Spain.

It is located in a valley, flanked by mountains along the banks of the Caudal River (Rio Caudal) and Route 66 in the center of Asturias. Mieres has a hodgepodge of small museums, cultural centers, art galleries and numerous restaurant–bars, boutiques and shops. The highest concentration of shopping is located along Manuel Llanez street and the pedestrian mall La Vega street. The cities of Oviedo and Gijón are not so far, connected with Mieres by bus line, and regional rail lines FEVE and RENFE.
Mieres. A campus of University of Oviedo is located in the town, Campus de Barredo.

Important buildings 

Town Hall
Market 
Barredo Mine
St. John's church
Requexu Square
Culture House
Jovellanos Park
Holy Family church
Basque-Asturian Railway ancient station
La villa old town

References

Parishes in Mieres